Døvigen is a Norwegian surname. Notable people with the surname include:

Kjersti Døvigen (born 1943), Norwegian actress
Ulrikke Hansen Døvigen (born 1971), Norwegian actress, daughter of Kjersti

Norwegian-language surnames